The QSZ-92 is a semi-automatic pistol designed by Norinco.

History
The development of the QSZ-92 pistol began circa 1994 and it is now being adopted by the People's Liberation Army's forces. The export variants (9×19 mm versions) include the CF-98 (barrel life c. 8,000 rds) and the NP-42 (barrel life c. 10,000 rds). The latter is the basic version without provisions for suppressor etc. Both have so far found commercial export in Canada.

On May 4, 2022, there were reports that the Hong Kong Police Force is considering the adoption of Chinese-made pistols, including the QSZ-92, to replace their revolvers as parts necessary to maintain them are running out. This is also being considered because of small arms export restrictions from Europe and North America after the National Security Law was implemented.

Design
The pistol operates with a recoil-operated, locked-breech and has a rotating barrel locking system, in which the barrel rotates on recoil to lock and unlock itself from the slide, and the front part of the frame under the barrel is shaped as an accessory rail to accept laser sights or flash lights. A unique feature of this pistol is the detachable steel frame that sits inside the polymer grip and contains the fire control group. Like many modern military pistols, the QSZ-92 has a double-action/single-action trigger with a combined safety/decocker.

Its dual stack magazine holds either fifteen rounds of 9×19mm Parabellum ammunition (QSZ-92-9) or twenty proprietary 5.8×21mm Chinese-made armor-piercing rounds  with bottle-necked case and pointed bullets (QSZ-92-5.8), closely resembling the Belgian 5.7×28mm format. Unlike most pistol magazines which narrow at the top for a consistent single-feed angle, the QSZ-92 has true double column staggered-feed in the same manner as many rifle magazines.

The star engraving on the pistol grip indicates the ammo type. 9×19mm Parabellum version has the star, while military 5.8×21mm version does not. Export variants, which are chambered in 9×19mm Parabellum ammunition, have the star engraving.

Accessory
QSZ-92 is fitted with QUS-181 suppressor. The suppressor is mounted on the rail instead of the muzzle due to the rotating barrel design.

Variants
QSZ-92: basic variant, which chambers the bottlenecked 5.8×21mm DAP92 ammunition or 9×19mm Parabellum. Its R50 value is smaller than 5 cm, R100 value smaller than 11 cm. Its failure rate is lower than 2 out of 1000 and its lifespan is 3000 rounds.
 QSZ-92-5.8: Military version for the PLA.
 QSZ-92-9: Police version. 
QSZ-92G: redesigned variant with improved reliability, ergonomics and under-rail for attachments. barrel life span is increased to 10,000 rounds. 
 QSZ-92G-5.8: Military version.
 QSZ-92G-9: Police version. 
CF98: export variant chambering 9×19mm Parabellum with a lifespan of 8000 rounds.
NP42: redesigned export variant chambering 9×19mm Parabellum with a lifespan of 10000 rounds, staggered-feed capacity of 15/10 rounds, and a decreased failure rate of 1 out of 1000. Its accuracy has been improved, with a R50 value of smaller than 4 cm and R100 value of less than 9 cm.
CS/LP5: compact pistol chambered in 9mm with 7 round magazines and a service life of 8,000 rounds.
QSZ-92A: Improved model showcased in 2021. Standard variant of the new QSZ-92 platform.
QSZ-92B: Improved model showcased in 2021. Compact variant of the new QSZ-92 platform.
QSZ-193: Improved model showcased in 2021. Subcompact variant of the new QSZ-92 platform.

Users

: People's Liberation Army, People's Armed Police, Chinese police force
 : 660 NP-42 received in 2014

References

External links

Norinco NP42 Pistol Operation and Maintenance Manual

Semi-automatic pistols of the People's Republic of China
5.8 mm firearms
9mm Parabellum semi-automatic pistols
Norinco